Stockholm is an unincorporated community located in the southeastern part of Hardyston Township in Sussex County, New Jersey, United States. Its ZIP Code is 07460.  Like many neighboring towns, Stockholm is home to a number of lakes including Deer Trail Lakes, Lake Stockholm, Lake Gerard, Beaver Lake, Lake Tamarack and Summit Lake.

Stockholm was known in colonial times as Snufftown and was named after Stockholm, Sweden. The New Jersey Midland Railway named a station in the area "Stockholm", which replaced "Snufftown".

As of the 2010 United States Census, the population for ZIP Code Tabulation Area 07460 was 3,457.

Climate
This climatic region is typified by large seasonal temperature differences, with warm to hot (and often humid) summers and cold (sometimes severely cold) winters.  According to the Köppen Climate Classification system, Stockholm has a humid continental climate, abbreviated "Dfb" on climate maps. This climate makes it suitable for naturism and the Rock Lodge Club naturist resort is near Lake Stockholm.

Notable people

People who were born in, residents of, or otherwise closely associated with Hardyston Township include:
 A. L. A. Himmelwright (1865-1936), a civil engineer, author, adventurer and marksman who was the general manager of The Roebling Construction Company.
 Christopher Sieber (born 1969), actor best known for his roles as Kevin Burke in Two of a Kind starring Mary-Kate Olsen and Ashley Olsen, and Lord Farquaad in Shrek the Musical.

References

Hardyston Township, New Jersey
Nude beaches
Unincorporated communities in Sussex County, New Jersey
Unincorporated communities in New Jersey